Abū al-Qāsim ʿAlī ibn al-Ḥusayn al-Sharīf al-Murtaḍā (Arabic: أبو القاسم علي بن الحسين الشريف المرتضى ) (commonly known as: Sharīf Murtaḍā, Sayyid Murtaḍā, (Murtazā instead of Murtaḍā in non-Arab languages) (965 - 1044 AD ; 355 - 436 AH) also popular as ʿAlam al-Hudā was one of the greatest Shia scholars of his time and was one of the students of Shaykh al-Mufīd . He was the elder brother of Al-Sharif al-Radi (Seyyed Razi), the compiler of Nahj al-Balagha. He was four years older than his brother. He lived during the era of Buyid dynasty.  It was the golden age of Arabic literature, and great poets Al-Ma'arri were among his contemporaries.

Lineage
He was born in Baghdad in 355 Lunar in Rajab Month. He was born in a prominent household. His lineage come backs to Imam al-Kazim. he was son of al-Sharif Abu Ahmad al-Husayn the son of Musa son of Muhammad son of Musa son of Ibrahim son of Imam Musa al-Kazim. Therefore, his sixth ancestor was the seventh Imam of Shia. His father called him Ali and his nickname was Murtada. His honorific title was Alam al-Huda. He called as Alam al-Huda according to a popular narration said by Shahid Awwal in The book of Arba'in as follow:  the Vizier of Abbasid dynasty namely Muhammad ibn al-Husayn became sick . he saw in his dreams Imam Ali while address him: tell Alam al-Huda till demand Health for you. When Muhammad ibn al-Husayn ask on the person with such a nickname he told : he is Ali ibn al-Husayn or Sharif Murtada.

Maternal Ancestry
The name of Sharif al-Murtada's mother was Fatima. She was a pious and noble lady, who was held in high esteem by scholars and other notables. At her request, the great scholar Shaykh al-Mufīd compiled the book "Ahkām al-Nisā'", which contains the fiqhi rules for women. Her family had carved out an independent principality in Tabaristan, on the southern coasts of the Caspian Sea. She died in Baghdad, in the year 995, (385 AH).

Family tree 

 From father's side

 Sayyid Ali al-Sharif al-Murtada
 Sayyid Husayn
 Sayyid Musa al-Abrash
 Sayyid Muhammad al-A'raj
 Sayyid Musa Abu Sibha
 Sayyid Ibrahim al-Murtada
 Imam Musa al-Kazim
 Imam Ja'far al-Sadiq
 Imam Muhammad al-Baqir
 Imam Ali Zayn al-Abidin
 Imam Husayn al-Shahid
 Imam Ali al-Murtada
 Prophet Muhammad 

 From mother's side

 Sayyid Ali al-Sharif al-Murtada
 Sayyida Fatima
 Sayyid Husayn
 Sayyid Hasan al-Nasir al-Kabir
 Sayyid Ali
 Sayyid Hasan
 Sayyid Ali
 Sayyid Umar al-Ashraf
 Imam Ali Zayn al-Abidin
 Imam Husayn al-Shahid
 Imam Ali al-Murtada
 Prophet Muhammad

Theology
Since he was the pupil of both Qadi Abd al-Jabbar the Mu'tazilite and al-Shaykh al-Mufid, he was influenced by both of them. He even criticised them.

Reason and Revelation
According to Sharif al-Murtada, the first part of religious duty is the obligation to reason to the knowledge of God. The other duties are dependent on this first duty. Al-Murtada along with the Mu'tazilite starting-point is the claim that man's first duty is to use his reason to arrive at the knowledge of God. Also in Kalam there is proof of the existence of God, he defended the atomist' stance versus that of the Aristotelian notion of substantial change.

God's attributes
He believed that we must not limit our-selves to applying those names mentioned in Quran.

Death
Sayyid Murtaḍā acquired the epithet of: "ʿAlam al-Hudā" ("The banner of guidance"), and died at the age of 81 years in 1044 (436 AH).

Work and Contribution
He was a multi-dimensional personality. All Shi'ite scholars acknowledge that Sayyid Murtaḍā was the greatest scholar of his era, and groomed many outstanding ulama (scholars), including the famous Shaykh al-Tūsī, the founder of the celebrated theological Center of Najaf. He served as "Naqīb al-Nuqabā'" after the death of his brother.  

Sayyid Murtaḍā was deeply interested in fiqh, unlike Sayyid Raḍī, who was more inclined towards politics and literature,. He was considered a master of kalam, fiqh, usul al-fiqh, literature, grammar, poetry and other fields of knowledge. His divan or poetry collection has more than 20,000 verses.

Books authored by Sayyid Murtaḍā include:
 al-Dhakhīra fī Uṣūl al-Fiqh ( الذخيرة )
 al-Ghurar wa al-Durar  ( الغرر والدرر )
 al-Intiṣār ( الانتصار )
 al-Shāfī ( الشافي )
 Tanzīh al-Anbiyāʾ ( تنزيه الأنبياء )
 Jumal al-ʿilm Wa al-ʿAmal.

See also
 Fakhrul Mulk
 Sayyid Raḍī
 Shaykh al-Mufīd
 Shaykh al-Tūsī
 Shaykh al-Sadūq
 Muḥammad al-Kulaynī
 Allāmah Majlisī
 Shaykh al-Ḥurr al-ʿĀmilī

References

External links 
 

960s births
1044 deaths
10th-century Arabs
11th-century Arabs
11th-century Muslim scholars of Islam
Iraqi Shia Muslims
Shia scholars of Islam
Twelvers
Hashemite people
Al-Moussawi family